385446 Manwë , or (385446) Manwë–Thorondor , is a binary resonant Kuiper belt object in a 4:7 mean-motion resonance with Neptune. It was discovered on 25 August 2003, by American astronomer Marc Buie at Cerro Tololo Observatory in northern Chile. A study of Manwë's light curve in 2019 suggests that it may be a contact binary object.

Discovery and naming 
Manwë was discovered on 25 August 2003 by M. W. Buie at Cerro Tololo as a part of the Deep Ecliptic Survey. The object was named after Manwë, the fictional king of the Valar in J. R. R. Tolkien's Middle-earth legendarium. Manwë is foremost among the great spirits who rule the world, and takes special responsibility for the air and winds. Thorondor is the Lord of Eagles in the First Age in Tolkien's writing.

Physical properties 
Manwë has significant and irregular photometric variability, demonstrating that its components are not tidally locked. The surfaces of Manwë and Thorondor appear to be very red. The composition of Manwë is unknown but likely to be mostly ice, because the nominal density (with large uncertainty) is less than that of water. At least one other Kuiper belt object, has been found with a density of less than 1 g/cm3, which implies an object made mostly of ice with a low rock fraction and high porosity.

Orbit 
Manwë has a low orbital inclination of 2.6 degrees. Its orbit is elongated, with an orbital eccentricity of 0.11. Due to its eccentric orbit, Manwë's distance from the Sun varies over the course of its orbit, approaching 38.9 AU at perihelion and 48.6 AU at aphelion.

Satellite

Physical characteristics 
Being part of a binary system, Manwë has one known companion named Thorondor, formally designated (385446) Manwë I Thorondor. The rotation period of Thorondor is uncertain, though a best-fit model suggests a very slow rotation period of 309.3 days. Thorondor's rotation is expected to be chaotic like Pluto's smaller moons, as a result of gravitational torquing by Manwë over the course of their eccentric mutual orbit. Thorondor's light curve has considerable photometric variability, with the relative magnitude of the two objects measured variously from 0.6–2.1 over the course of a few years. This implies that Thorondor could have a very flattened shape, akin to the larger lobe of the contact binary Kuiper belt object 486958 Arrokoth. Assuming a ellipsoid shape for Thorondor, a best-fit model for its shape suggests the aspect ratios of a/c = 7.33 and b/c = 6.67.

Orbit 
The satellite's orbit has the following parameters: semi-major-axis, ; period, ; eccentricity, ; and inclination,  The total system mass is about 1.94 kg.

Mutual events 
Manwë and Thorondor were expected to go through a period of mutual occultations and transits from 2014–2018, where one object crosses in front of the other as seen from Earth. Pluto and Charon went through a similar series of mutual events from 1985–1990. Observations of these events could allow for better estimates of the radii of the two objects and their densities, as well as possibly determining their shapes and mapping surface color and albedo features. The first event, an inferior occultation, is predicted for 2014 July 16, and they continue until 2018 October 25.

The actual observations revealed none of the four predicted occultations, likely due error measuring orbital period of Thorondor, although photometry data gathered during observation campaign have allowed to determine that Manwë is a highly bilobate contact binary, likely surrounded by rapidly orbiting moonlets besides Thorondor.

References

External links 
 
 

385446
Discoveries by Marc Buie
Named minor planets
Binary trans-Neptunian objects
20030825
385446
Things named after Tolkien works